Reflection is the eighth studio album by Belgian band Hooverphonic. It was released on 15 November 2013 via Columbia Records/Sony Music. Recording sessions took place at private homes in Gentbrugge, Rachecourt-Suzémont, Boom, Hasselt & Hoeselt. It spawned five singles: "Amalfi", "Ether", "Boomerang", "ABC of Apology" and "Gravity".

The album peaked at number-one on the Ultratop 200 Albums in the Flanders region, at number six in Wallonia, and was certified Platinum by Belgian Entertainment Association on 24 January 2014.

Track listing

Personnel 
 Noémie Wolfs – lead vocals
 Raymond Geerts – guitar (tracks: 2, 3, 6-10, 12, 13, 15), electric guitar (track 4), acoustic guitar (track 11)
 Alex Callier – bass guitar (tracks: 1-4, 6, 8-13, 15), glockenspiel (track 9), toy harmonium (track 11), percussion and additional synth (track 12), mellotron (track 13), engineering, producer
 Yassin Joris – backing vocals (tracks: 1, 2, 4, 5, 7-13, 15)
 Tom Tritsmans – backing vocals (tracks: 1, 2, 4, 5, 7-13, 15)
 Joey Brocken – backing vocals (tracks: 1, 2, 4, 5, 7-13, 15)
 Gianluigi Fazio – vocoded vocals (track 11)
 Luca Chiaravalli – acoustic guitar (tracks: 1, 4), electric guitar (tracks: 4, 11), additional keyboards (track 11)
 Marco Trentacoste – electric guitar (track 1)
 Remko Kühne – piano (tracks: 1, 3-5, 7, 10, 11, 14, 15), mellotron (tracks: 2, 4, 8-10), Farfisa electric organ (tracks: 4, 12), clavinet (track 4), Hammond electric organ (track 6), electric piano (track 9)
 Peter Claes – piano (track 6), percussion (track 8), engineering
 Lennart Dauphin – electric upright bass (track 7)
 Arnout Hellofs – drums (tracks: 1-4, 6-13, 15), tambourine (track 15)
 Door Raeymaeckers – percussion (tracks: 1, 2, 6, 8, 15)
 Ronald Prent – mixing
 Greg Calbi – mastering

Charts

Weekly charts

Year-end charts

Certifications

See also
List of number-one albums of 2013 (Belgium)

References

External links 

2013 albums
Hooverphonic albums
Sony Music Belgium albums